Pokémon: Diamond and Pearl: Galactic Battles (advertised as Pokémon: DP Galactic Battles) is the twelfth season of the Pokémon animated series and the third season of Pokémon the Series: Diamond and Pearl, known in Japan as . It originally aired in Japan from December 4, 2008, to December 24, 2009, on TV Tokyo, and in the United States from May 9, 2009, to May 15, 2010, on Cartoon Network, covering the continuing adventures of series protagonist Ash Ketchum as he continues to travel Sinnoh with Dawn, Pikachu, and Brock.



Episode list

Music 
The Japanese opening songs are "High Touch!" (ハイタッチ！, Hai Tatchi!) for 29 episodes, and "High Touch! 2009" (ハイタッチ！ 2009, Hai Tatchi! 2009) for 24 episodes by Rika Matsumoto and Megumi Toyoguchi. The ending songs are "Surely Tomorrow" (あしたはきっと, Ashita wa Kitto) by Kanako Yoshii for 16 episodea, "Get Fired Up, Spiky-eared Pichu!" (もえよギザみみピチュー！, Moe yo Giza Mimi Pichū!) by Shoko Nakagawa for 24 episodes, "Which One ~ Is It?" (ドッチ〜ニョ？, Dotchi~Nyo?) by MooMoo Milk and Araki-san for 13 episodes, and the English opening song is "Battle Cry - (Stand Up!)" by Erin Bowman. Its instrumental version served as the ending credit song.

Home media releases
Viz Media and Warner Home Video have released the series in the United States in four 2-disc boxsets, or eight individual single-disc volume sets.

The first boxset was released on March 15, 2011, and contains 15 episodes altogether (7 on Disc 1, and 8 on Disc 2). The second was released on May 10, 2011, and contains 12 episodes altogether (6 per disc). The third boxset was released on August 30, 2011, and also contains 12 episodes altogether (6 per disc). The fourth boxset was released on November 22, 2011, and contained 13 episodes altogether (6 on Disc 1, and 7 on Disc 2).

Viz Media and Warner Home Video later released the complete series on a 7-disc DVD boxset on August 18, 2020.

References

External links 
 
  at TV Tokyo 
  at TV Tokyo 
  at Pokémon JP official website 

2008 Japanese television seasons
2009 Japanese television seasons
Season12